Richard Leslie Francis-Bruce  (born 10 December 1948) is an Australian film editor who has received several nominations for the Academy Award for Best Film Editing.

Career 

Francis-Bruce aspired to be a cinematographer like his father, Jack Bruce, who worked for Hollywood players like Cecil B. DeMille and the Famous Lansky Players. Nonetheless, Richard's aspirations landed him an editing gig at the Australian Broadcasting Corporation (ABC) in Sydney, where he spent 15 years honing his craft.

Francis-Bruce collaborated with filmmaker George Miller on a plethora of films including Mad Max Beyond Thunderdome (1985), The Witches of Eastwick (1987), and Lorenzo's Oil (1992).

Francis-Bruce later earned Academy Award nominations for his Best Film Editing work on Frank Darabont's The Shawshank Redemption (1994), David Fincher's Seven (1995) and Wolfgang Petersen's Air Force One (1997). Francis-Bruce was nominated for ACE Eddie Awards for The Shawshank Redemption, The Rock (directed by Michael Bay - 1996), Air Force One, and for Harry Potter and the Philosopher's Stone (directed by Chris Columbus - 2001). In 1997, he was invited to become a member of the American Cinema Editors (ACE).

In 1996, Francis-Bruce visited Australia and spoke at a seminar at the Australian Film Television and Radio School entitled Frame by Frame. Francis-Bruce explained the importance of understanding internal rhythm and external rhythm as well as the choices he made in and between every shot throughout the film Seven.

Filmography

References

External links 

Australian film editors
American Cinema Editors
1948 births
Living people
People from Sydney
People educated at Sydney Grammar School
Members of the Order of Australia